Gordon Henry Burns (born 10 June 1942) is a Northern Irish journalist and broadcaster. He was the host of The Krypton Factor for its original 18-year run (1977–1995) and was the chief anchorman for the BBC regional news programme North West Tonight from January 1997 to October 2011. In November 2011, Burns moved back to Belfast where he was born.

Due to his work commitments with Granada Television on programmes such as World in Action and Granada Reports and later BBC Manchester for North West Tonight, he resided in Manchester for over thirty years. Burns most recently hosted a Sunday morning radio show for BBC Radio Manchester and BBC Radio Lancashire. He is known for a bona fide style of presenting which has made him popular with his audience.

Early life 
Burns was born in Wellington Park, in Belfast. When he was a child his family moved to Kent where he attended the local primary school and then went to Dulwich College in London. The family then returned to live at Belfast's Belmont Road, where Gordon attended Campbell College.

Career
He began his journalism career working on the Belfast Telegraph and worked on BBC radio's long-running Sports Report before joining Ulster Television as a sports editor and programme producer in 1967. Two years later, Burns began presenting the nightly news programme UTV Reports, first as a stand-in for regular frontman David Mahlowe and later as a chief anchor, during the early stages of The Troubles. In 1973, Burns joined Granada Television to anchor their nightly news programme Granada Reports and to work on the station's current affairs output, including World in Action.

In September 1976 he presented a edition of the North West Friday night Football preview programme Kick Off covering for the regular presenter  Gerald Sinstadt who that weekend was covering for Dickie Davies on World of Sport and was also covering the presenter and commentator roles for the Sunday Afternoon match highlights based version The Kick Off Match where he presented the programme and commentated on Sunderland v Manchester City at Roker Park which was being covered by Tyne Tees cameras for Granada viewers which was the main match that weekend at the time he was the producer of both Kick Off and The Kick Off Match but this stint as presenter and commentator was a one-off

Burns' national profile began with his association of ITV's game show The Krypton Factor which he presented for eighteen years from 1977 to 1995. He was the presenter of Password for Ulster, one of their few programmes shown throughout the ITV network, and also hosted a segment in several series of LWT's Surprise Surprise. During the 1980s, Burns also continued reporting from the political party conferences for the ITV network and presenting the Channel 4 current affairs series Irish Angle. In the early 90s, he also presented two parlour game shows for the BBC – A Word in Your Ear and Relatively Speaking. He has also appeared as a guest on Noel's House Party, and on Shooting Stars as a member of Ulrika Jonsson's team.

From 1997 to 2011, Burns presented North West Tonight, alongside its shorter lunchtime version, North West Today. In 2007, Ranvir Singh joined as co-anchor of the previously single-headed main evening programme. Burns announced in April 2011 that he would be retiring from the role but would move on to present a Sunday morning show on BBC Radio Manchester and BBC Radio Lancashire in September 2011 with his last TV bulletin broadcast on 30 September.

He was the voice of "The Chain" feature and other features on the Radcliffe & Maconie show on BBC Radio 6 Music. He appears as a guest on the show when The Chain reaches a significant milestone, for example, for the 5,000th (musically based) item on 3 March 2015 which was the single "Dancing Queen" by ABBA.

In 2013, Burns retired properly after stepping down from his radio show.

Personal life
Burns is the second cousin of British singer/songwriter Ed Sheeran. Burns is married and has two adult children.

References

External links
 
 Gordon at Wallace High school

1942 births
Living people
BBC newsreaders and journalists
BBC North West newsreaders and journalists
Game show hosts from Northern Ireland
Journalists from Belfast
Television presenters from Northern Ireland
People educated at Dulwich College
People educated at Campbell College
Television personalities from Belfast
UTV (TV channel)
People educated at Wallace High School, Lisburn